Bunge is a surname. Notable people with the surname include:

Alexander Bunge (1803–1890), Baltic-German botanist; brother of Friedrich Georg von Bunge (1802–1897); father of Alexander von Bunge (physician) (1851–1930), and Gustav von Bunge (1844–1920)
Alexander von Bunge (physician) (1851–1930), Baltic-German physician, zoologist, and Arctic explorer; a son of Alexander Bunge (1803–1890)
Bettina Bunge (born 1963), German tennis player
Edouard Bunge (1851–1927), Belgian businessman, banker, and philanthropist
Friedrich Georg von Bunge (1802–1897), German legal historian; brother of Alexander Bunge (1803–1890)
Gustav von Bunge (1844–1920), German physiologist; a son of Alexander Bunge (1803–1890)
Mario Bunge (1919–2020), Argentine philosopher and physicist, married to Marta
Marta Bunge, Argentine-Canadian mathematician, married to Mario
Nikolay Bunge (1823–1895), Russian economist and statesman
William Bunge (1928–2013), U.S. American geographer
Franklin Maurice Bunge (1932–2013) U.S American aerospace propulsion engineer